The Four Seasons Centre for the Performing Arts is a 2,071-seat theatre in Toronto, Ontario, Canada, located at the southeast corner of University Avenue and Queen Street West, across from Osgoode Hall. The land on which it is located was a gift from the Government of Ontario. It is the home of the Canadian Opera Company (COC) and the National Ballet of Canada.  The building's modernist design by was created by Canadian firm Diamond and Schmitt Architects, headed by Jack Diamond. It was completed in 2006, and the interior design includes an unusual glass staircase.

History
In the 1980s, the Canadian Opera Company and financier Hal Jackman, president of the Ballet Opera House Corporation, had begun lobbying for a new building to replace the O'Keefe Centre (now known as Meridian Hall). This building had housed the opera company for about 40 years. The company had also previously been housed in the Royal Alexandra Theatre on King Street and the Elgin Theatre on Yonge Street. Earlier in the city's history, the Grand Opera House stood at Bay and Adelaide until it was demolished in 1927.

Bay Street proposal
In 1984, Ontario premier Bill Davis promised that a piece of provincially owned land at Bay Street and Wellesley Street would be the home for the new opera house. The lot was estimated to be worth some  million.

A design competition was won by the postmodern project of Moshe Safdie. In 1988, the project was approved and the existing stores and government offices on the site were demolished.

After a new NDP provincial government under Bob Rae was elected in 1990, inheriting a large deficit because of a recession, the  million project was deemed excessively costly. The province was also dealing with the unexpectedly high  million cost of the SkyDome project. When the opera house corporation refused to modify the design to lower costs, the government withdrew its funding commitment two months after the election. In 1992, the province cancelled the project and the land was sold to developers. Two towers in the "Opera Place" development have been built on Bay Street, but as of June 2011, the rest of the property remains vacant.

University Avenue project

In 1997, the province allocated a parking lot, which previously housed offices for the Supreme Court of Ontario at Queen and University, for the project. The lot was valued at  million, and the federal and provincial governments also pledged funding for a new more modest project that would cost about  million. The original plan called for a  tower of offices and condominiums to be built by Olympia and York which would help fund the project. It would be further supplemented by a  million donation by Christopher Ondaatje. However, both Olympia and York and Ondaatje developed concerns about the project and withdrew. More importantly, the municipal government of Toronto refused to provide any municipal funding. The project collapsed again in 2000.

In 2002, the opera company under Richard Bradshaw issued an invitation in 2002 for designs. The company had secured a  million donation from the Four Seasons hotel chain in exchange for perpetual naming rights to the complex. Ten architectural firms submitted proposals and the modernist design by Canadian company Diamond and Schmitt Architects, headed by Jack Diamond, was selected.

The complex took three years to construct at an estimated cost of  million. To provide wheelchair accessibility, elevator access to the concourse level of Osgoode subway station was integrated into the construction of the centre. The centre had its grand opening on 14 June 2006, with regularly scheduled performances commencing on 12 September 2006 with the inaugural production in the new opera house being Richard Wagner's epic tetralogy Der Ring des Nibelungen (The Ring of the Nibelung). Governor General Michaëlle Jean and other prominent Canadians attended the event. Three complete Ring Cycles were performed in September 2006.

R. Fraser Elliott Hall design

The five-tiered, horseshoe-shaped auditorium was modelled after European opera houses. Collaborating with Diamond Schmitt, New York-based theatre planning and design specialists Fisher Dachs Associates  arranged the room's geometry and seating configuration to bring each of the 2,000 seats, including tiered balconies, as close to the stage as possible while maintaining an unobstructed view.

The acoustics were designed by Bob Essert of Sound Space Design and a team that included Aercoustics Engineering, Wilson Ihrig  and Engineering Harmonics. The undulating back walls of the venue, which diffuse the sound throughout the auditorium by reflecting the sound waves back to the stage, account for about 90 percent of the audible sound for the audience. To prevent audience members from detecting specific sounds and vibrations including traffic noise, the rumble from the adjacent subway line and streetcar line, and even the sirens of the emergency vehicles rushing to the nearby hospitals, the theatre sits on 489 rubber insulating pads.

Other design elements reflect historic performance halls, including the Roman Amphitheatre.

Exterior
The hall was constructed on a limited budget, using contrasting materials. The City Room glass walls, curtain walls held by steel fixtures, look out on University Ave and Queen Street. The east, south and north sides are clad in dark brick. Windows on the north side have a view of Osgoode Hall, but the exterior on that side is unadorned.

On the west is the sidewalk extension City Room, which is transparent and which illuminates the street. The solid, massive eastern facade broken only by horizontal windows, in contrast, blends into its office building and brick surroundings, towards York Street. John Bentley Mays states in his 2006 Canadian Architect article that East wall is "unresponsive to the need of vitality on the street." The southern, Richmond Street facade, also plain brick punctuated by dressing room windows, is opposite the Hilton Hotel. Architect Diamond defends his rather plain design, stating, "You do not make a city out of iconic pieces".

Richard Bradshaw Amphitheatre
The Richard Bradshaw Amphitheatre in the City Room links Rings 3 and 4. It provides seating for 100 patrons. During the season several concerts per week in a variety of genres are presented here.

Operatic and other production history

Outside of the standard repertory, some of the less-often performed, new works, or national premieres performed by the Canadian Opera Company include:
 2006: First Canadian production of Richard Wagner's Der Ring Des Nibelungen
 2007: Lady Macbeth
 2008: From the House of the Dead
 2010: Maria Stuarda
 2011: Iphigenia in Tauris
 2012: Love From Afar
 2012: A Florentine Tragedy/Gianni Schicchi
 2012: Semele
 2018: Hadrian
Dancap Productions has also given presentations of musicals at the Four Seasons Centre, including:
 2010: Miss Saigon
 2010: South Pacific
 2011: Next to Normal
 2011: Colm Wilkinson in Concert
 2011: Come Fly Away

See also
Other performing arts venues in the city include:

 Budweiser Stage
 Massey Hall
 Meridian Arts Centre
 Meridian Hall

 Roy Thomson Hall

References

External links

Four Seasons Centre
Canadian Opera Company – Four Seasons Centre
Canadian Encyclopedia – Four Seasons Centre
Review construction progress
Aercoustics Engineering Limited

Concert halls in Canada
Opera houses in Canada
Music venues in Toronto
Music venues completed in 2006
Theatres completed in 2006
2006 establishments in Ontario